Maple Airport was a small airfield in the Township of Vaughan (now a city) in York Region, Ontario, Canada that was open from 1955 until 1987. The early runway were grass strip and paved over in 1960.

At one point, the Maple Airport was the third-busiest private commercial and civilian airport in Canada not to have a control tower.

The urbanization of Vaughan and the Maple area led to the closure of the airport in 1987.

Nothing remains of the airport today, which is now the site of a housing development and Le Petite Prince Catholic Elementary School. A small park in the neighbourhood, on Avro Road, was named Maple Airport Park in honour of the former airport.

Buildings

The early buildings of the airport were the farmhouse and barn from the original owners. Tie-down hangars were added, but no permanent airport structures were built.

Tenants
 Maple Flying Club
 Gillies Flying Service
 Maple Air Services Ltd.
 Neiltown Air Limited
 Auberge Maple Inn - restaurant

See also
 List of airports in the Greater Toronto Area
 List of abandoned airports in Canada

References
 Maple Creek PS
 Bruce Forsyth's Military History Page

Defunct airports in Ontario
Transport in Vaughan